Danangombe (formerly Dhlo-Dhlo or Ndlo Dlo, alternative spellings Danamombe per National Museums and Monuments of Zimbabwe, Dananombe and Danan'ombe) is a Zimbabwean archaeological site, about eighty kilometres from Gweru, in the direction of Bulawayo and about 35 kilometres south of the highway. It is not often visited due to the poor quality roads in the area. The remains on the site resemble those of Khami. Nearby are the smaller ruins at Naletale, that were occupied at the same time. The original name used by the Kalanga people is unknown as Dhlo-Dhlo (the name in Sindebele) was applied to the site later and it is unclear whether the name of Danangombe retains elements of the original name.

Danan(g)ombe (together with Khami and Naletale) was one of the centres of the Rozvi culture, which had succeeded the Torwa.

It is not to be confused with Danangombe Hill near Mutare.

Layout
The site consists of a ruined town dating from the 17th or 18th century AD, and therefore probably occupied just after the abandonment of the site at Khami. The town plan follows a similar layout to Khami but is on a smaller scale. It is therefore a deliberate attempt to sustain the society and culture that had been established at Khami. The most extensive foundations are on the highest ground and it appears that all the dwellings were constructed using walls of wood-reinforced mud, as all traces of these have been lost. The site was destroyed in the 1830s when the Matabele arrived in the area. See Mapungubwe, Great Zimbabwe, and Khami.

Sources and external links
Zimbabwe Khami Ruins from Bulawayo1872
Zimbabwe History from Africanet
Zimbabwe Information from Solomons Guide
K. Chikuse Effects of Ndebele raids on Shona power (proving the synonymity of Dhlodhlo and Danangombe)

References 

Archaeological sites in Zimbabwe
Former populated places in Zimbabwe
Archaeological sites of Eastern Africa